Flashing Guns is a 1947 American Western film directed by Lambert Hillyer and written by Frank H. Young. The film stars Johnny Mack Brown, Raymond Hatton, Riley Hill, Jan Bryant, Douglas Evans and James Logan. The film was released on July 16, 1947, by Monogram Pictures.

Plot

Cast              
Johnny Mack Brown as Johnny Mack
Raymond Hatton as Amos Shelby
Riley Hill as Fred Shelby
Jan Bryant as Ann Shelby
Douglas Evans as Longdon
James Logan as Mark Ainsworth 
Jack O'Shea as Sagebrush 
Edmund Cobb as Sheriff Ed Newman
Steve Clark as Cannon
Norman Jolley as Mike Foley
Frank LaRue as Judge 
Jack Rockwell as Cassidy
Craig Duncan as Dishpan 
Ted Adams as Ripley 
Gary Garrett as Duke 
Ray Jones as Stirrup

References

External links
 

1947 films
American Western (genre) films
1947 Western (genre) films
Monogram Pictures films
Films directed by Lambert Hillyer
American black-and-white films
1940s English-language films
1940s American films